Walter Dossenbach (6 March 1922 – 26 January 1999) was a Swiss weightlifter. He competed in the men's middleweight event at the 1952 Summer Olympics.

References

External links
 

1922 births
1999 deaths
Swiss male weightlifters
Olympic weightlifters of Switzerland
Weightlifters at the 1952 Summer Olympics